Dion may refer to:

People

Ancient 
Dion (mythology), a king in Laconia and husband of Iphitea, the daughter of Prognaus
Dion of Syracuse (408–354 BC), ancient Greek politician
Dio of Alexandria, first century BC, ancient Greek philosopher
Dion of Naples, an ancient Greek mathematician cited by Augustine of Hippo along with Adrastus of Cyzicus
Dio Chrysostom, also known as Dion Chrysostomos (c. 40 – c. 115), a Greek orator, writer, philosopher and historian
Cassius Dio, also known as Dion Kassios (c. AD 155 – 235), a Roman consul

Modern

Given name
Dion Bakker (born 1981), Dutch Youtuber and artist
Dion O'Banion, American mobster
Dion Boucicault (1820–1890), Irish actor and playwright
Dion Boucicault Jr. (1859–1929), American actor and stage director
Dion Dawkins (born 1994), American football player
Dion DiMucci (born 1939), American singer/songwriter known professionally as "Dion"
Dion Dublin (born 1969), English footballer
Dion Fortune (1890–1946), British occultist
Dion Ignacio (born 1986), Filipino actor
Dion Jenkins (born 1979), American singer-songwriter and producer called "Dion"
Dion Lambert (born 1969), American football player
Dion Lee (born 1985), Australian fashion designer
Dion Lewis (born 1990), American football player
Dion Nash (born 1971), New Zealand cricketer
Dion Nelin (born 1976), Danish  carom billiards player
Dion Phaneuf (born 1985), Canadian ice hockey player
Dion Titheradge (1889–1934), Australian actor and playwright
Dion Waiters (born 1991), American basketball player

Surname
Celine Dion (born 1968), Canadian singer
Colleen Dion (born 1964), American actress
Josh Dion Band, American music group led by singer/drummer Josh Dion
Olivier Dion (born 1991), Canadian pop singer
Pascal Dion (born 1994), Canadian short track speed skater
Stéphane Dion (born 1955), Canadian academic and politician

Places 
Dion, Archaeological Park, the ancient site of the religious center of Macedonia
Dion, Archaeological Museum, the finds of the ancient site are exhibited here
Dion, Pieria, the great "sacred place" of the Ancient Macedonians, ancient city and archaeological site, and a modern town
Dion (Chalcidice), a town of ancient Chalcidice
Dion (Coele-Syria), a town of ancient Coele-Syria, in the Decapolis of the Roman Empire
Dion (Crete), a town of ancient Crete
Dion (Euboea), a town of ancient Euboea
Dium (Pisidia) or Dion, a town of ancient Pisidia
Dion (Thessaly), a town of ancient Thessaly
Dion, part of the municipality of Beauraing, province of Namur, Belgium
Dion Islands, Antarctica

Other uses 
Dion (geometry), one-dimension polytope
Dion (skipper), a genus of butterflies in the grass skippers family
Mitsubishi Dion, a compact MPV produced by Mitsubishi Motors
Dion (Transformers), a character from the Transformers franchise
Dion Blaster, a character in 1080° Snowboarding
Dion (album), a 1968 album by Dion DiMucci

See also 
Deon, given name
Deion, given name
Dio (disambiguation)
Dione (disambiguation)
Dionne (disambiguation)
Dionne (name)
Dionysius (disambiguation)